Coleophora charistis is a moth of the family Coleophoridae that is endemic to Morocco.

References

External links

charistis
Moths of Africa
Endemic fauna of Morocco
Moths described in 1928